Lars Gustafsson (born 1951) is a Swedish Christian democratic politician and member of the Riksdag since 1998.

References

1951 births
Date of birth missing (living people)
Living people
Members of the Riksdag 1998–2002
Members of the Riksdag 2002–2006
Members of the Riksdag 2006–2010
Members of the Riksdag 2010–2014
Members of the Riksdag from the Christian Democrats (Sweden)
Place of birth missing (living people)